Yuvakudu ( Young Man) is a 2000 India Telugu-language romantic drama film released on May 18, 2000. It was produced by Akkineni Nagarjuna and N.Sudhakar Reddy, and directed by A. Karunakaran. It stars Sumanth and Bhumika Chawla. The film was the second venture for both Karunakaran and Sumanth. The film was critically hailed, even though it had an above average run at the box office. The film won two Nandi Awards. The climax is based on a real incident that happened in Coimbatore. It marked Bhumika Chawla’s Telugu and at the same time, film debut.

Plot 
Yuvakudu is the story of a free spirited college student Siva (Sumanth) who shares a very close bond with his mother (Jayasudha). He is the son of an army officer killed in the line of duty. Despite his mother's disapproval, Siva secretly harbours a strong desire of following in his father's footsteps and joining the army. Meanwhile, he falls in love with Sindhu (Bhumika Chawla), but she does not reciprocate his love. She rejects his  proposal, and the relationship takes a sour tone. Siva's mother, aware of her son's love for Sindhu, tries to bring them together. She meets Sindhu, who takes an instant liking for her. She eventually asks Sindhu to marry her son. Sindhu accepts the proposal, saying that she is doing so only for Siva's mother. Despite a rocky start, their marriage finally settles down, and Sindhu grows to love Siva. However, the story takes an unexpected turn when Siva gets recruited into the army. He joins the army against his mother's wishes, thereby causing a rift. Siva eventually proves himself in the line of duty and reconciles with his mother and Sindhu.

Cast 
 Sumanth as Siva
 Bhumika Chawla as Sindhu, Love interest of Siva
 Jayasudha as Padmavati, Siva's mother
 Ali as Siva's friend
 Venu Madhav as Satish
 Kota Srinivasa Rao as R. T. C. Officer
 Surya as Police officer
 Master Tanish

Soundtrack

Awards
Nandi Awards - 2000
Best Character Actress - Jayasudha
Special Jury Award - Nagarjuna (producer of the film)

References

External links 
 

2000s Telugu-language films
Films directed by A. Karunakaran
Indian romantic drama films
2000 films
Films set in Hyderabad, India
Films shot in Hyderabad, India
Films shot in Ooty
2000s war drama films
Indian war drama films
Films scored by Mani Sharma
2000 romantic drama films